Falea (also Valea) is a small uninhabited island in the Pacific Ocean, a part of the Shepherd Islands archipelago in the Shefa Province of Vanuatu.

Geography
The island, located 1.8 km north-west of the island of Tongariki, measures 1 km in length and 250 m in width. The maximum elevation is about 100 meters above the sea level.

References

Islands of Vanuatu
Shefa Province
Uninhabited islands of Vanuatu